Dendrobium williamsonii is a species of orchid, commonly known as Williamson's dendrobium. It is native to southern China (Guangxi, Hainan, Yunnan), Assam, and Indochina (Thailand, Myanmar, Vietnam). It is an epiphyte and grows on tree trunks in forests.

References

williamsonii
Flora of East Himalaya
Flora of Indo-China
Orchids of Assam
Orchids of Yunnan
Flora of Guangxi
Flora of Hainan
Plants described in 1869